This is a list of youth parliaments. Youth governments or youth councils are a form of youth voice engaged in community decision-making.

Europe 

 UK Youth Parliament, British organization of chosen young representatives
Welsh Youth Parliament, democratically elected youth model legisture
 Scottish Youth Parliament, a Scottish youth organization
 Youth Parliament (Greece), a Greek youth organization
Bradford-Keighley Youth Parliament, an English organization of chosen young representatives

America

United States 
YMCA Youth Parliament, a US youth parliament

Canada 
 Youth Parliament of Canada, a Canadian youth parliament
 TUXIS Parliament of Alberta, a Canadian youth parliament
 British Columbia Youth Parliament, a Canadian youth parliament
 Youth Parliament of Manitoba, a Canadian youth parliament
 Maritime Youth Parliament, a Canadian youth parliament
 Newfoundland and Labrador Youth Parliament, a number of Canadian youth parliaments
 Ontario Youth Parliament, a number of Canadian youth parliaments
 Parlement Jeunesse du Québec, a Canadian youth parliament
 Saskatchewan Youth Parliament, a Canadian youth parliament
 Western Canada Youth Parliament, a number of Canadian youth parliaments

Asia 
 Youth Parliament of Malaysia, a youth council and parliament in Malaysia
 The YP Foundation, an Indian support organization for youth
 Youth Parliament Program, an Indian support organization for youth
 Youth Parliament of Pakistan, a Pakistani project to engage youth to the democratic process and practices
 Afghan Youth Parliament, an Afghan organization of young representatives
 National Youth Council, a Nepali government wing to engage youth to the parliamentary procedure and to enhance youth in entrepreneurship development, strengthening democracy, creating opportunities and goals.

Oceania 
 New Zealand Youth Parliament, an annual youth parliant event in New Zealand
 YMCA NSW Youth Parliament, a New South Wales youth parliament
YMCA Youth Parliament, there is a YMCA Youth Parliament in every State and Territory in Australia

Association of countries 

 The Commonwealth Youth Parliament, model parliament of delegates from over 53 countries
 Model UN Youth Summit, youth conference of countries of the United Nations engaging youth in worldwide issues
 Model NATO Youth Summit, transatlantic conference of countries of NATO engaging youth in international military-security issues
 Model Arab League, youth conference of countries of The Arab League on US-Arab relations
 European Youth Parliament, a ngo to encourage opinion forming and political engagement by youth
European Youth Parliament - Ireland
European Youth Parliament – Ukraine
European Youth Parliament Belgium